The 1922–23 National Challenge Cup was the annual open cup held by the United States Football Association now known as the Lamar Hunt U.S. Open Cup.

Bracket
Home teams listed on top of bracket

(*): replay after tied match
w/o: walkover/forfeit victory awarded

Final

 Paterson F.C. was declared the winner when Scullin Steel declined to replay the game.  Many of Scullin's players played professional baseball and left to join their teams, depleting Scullin to the point it would not have fielded a competitive team.

See also
1923 American Cup
1923 National Amateur Cup

References

Sources
 USOpenCup.com

U.S. Open Cup
Nat